1st Commando Brigade may refer to:

1st Commando Brigade (Turkey)
1st Special Service Brigade, United Kingdom